The year 1927 in archaeology involved some significant events.

Explorations

Excavations
 Large scale excavations begin at Peking Man Site in Zhoukoudian, China under Canadian paleoanthropologist Davidson Black with support from the Rockefeller Foundation.
 The Swedish Cyprus Expedition begins 3½ years of excavations under Einar Gjerstad.
 Excavations at Skara Brae begin under V. Gordon Childe (completed in 1930).
 Excavations at Tepe Gawra begin by an American team under Ephraim Avigdor Speiser.
 Pločnik archaeological site discovered in southern Serbia, with findings of the Vinca culture (5500 BC).
 Excavations begin at Garðar Cathedral Ruins.

Finds
 Davidson Black's excavations at Peking Man Site in Zhoukoudian, China yield a human tooth that he proposed belonged to a new species that he names Sinanthropus pekinensis.
 Skeleton of Asselar man discovered by Théodore Monod and Wladimir Besnard in the Adrar des Ifoghas.
 Kents Cavern 4 maxilla found in England.
 Leonard Woolley's excavations at Ur uncover the Enheduanna calcite disc.
 "Priest-King" sculpture from the Indus Valley civilisation found at Mohenjo-daro.
 First location of wreckage from the VOC Zuytdorp in Western Australia.
 Pilot Percy Maitland observes stone wheel-like structures across Syria and Saudi Arabia.

Publications
 March - The journal Antiquity is first published in the United Kingdom. In the first two issues, the editor O. G. S. Crawford dismisses the Glozel artifacts as largely fakes.
 Alan Gardiner's Egyptian Grammar: Being an Introduction to the Study of Hieroglyphs is first published.

Other events
 Work begins on draining Lake Nemi to recover the Nemi ships.
 December - An international commission declares most artefacts from the excavations at Glozel to be forgeries.

Births
 January 14 - Rodolphe Kasser, Swiss philologist and archaeologist (d. 2013)
 February 10 - Bridget Allchin, British archaeologist and prehistorian (d. 2017)
 July 1 - Leo Klejn, Russian archaeologist, anthropologist and philologist (d. 2019)
 November 4 - Ivor Noël Hume, British historical archaeologist (d. 2017)

Deaths
 January 21 - Gen. Sir Charles Warren, British Biblical archaeologist (born 1840)

References

Archaeology
Archaeology
Archaeology by year